Rafaelia rufiventris is a species of flesh flies (insects in the family Sarcophagidae).

References

Sarcophagidae
Articles created by Qbugbot
Insects described in 1917